Gradl is a German surname. Notable people with the surname include:

 Hans Gradl, German World War II soldier
 Johann Baptist Gradl (1904–1988), German politician

See also
 Grad (surname)

German-language surnames